The men's 4 × 10 kilometre relay cross-country skiing event was part of the cross-country skiing programme at the 1952 Winter Olympics. It was the third appearance of the event. The competition was held on Saturday, 23 February 1952. Fifty-two cross-country skiers from 13 nations competed.

Medalists

Results

References

External links
Official Olympic Report
 

Men's 4 x 10 kilometre relay
Men's 4 × 10 kilometre relay cross-country skiing at the Winter Olympics